Tom Bramble is a socialist activist, author and retired academic based in Queensland, Australia. He taught Industrial Relations at the University of Queensland for many years and has authored numerous books and articles on the Australian labour movement. He is a member of Socialist Alternative.

Political history 
Bramble has been politically active since the late 1970s and was a trade unionist throughout his working life. He is a member of the National Executive of the Trotskyist organisation, Socialist Alternative (SA) and is a regular contributor to SA's publications, including Red Flag and the Marxist Left Review.

Academic history 
Bramble taught Industrial Relations at the University of Queensland from 1993 until his retirement in 2015. He holds a PhD from La Trobe University in the same field, a Master of Commerce (Hons) from the University of New South Wales, and won the University medal in Economics from the University of Cambridge when he graduated with his BA (Honours) in 1982.

Publication history 
In 2021, Bramble co-authored (with Mick Armstrong) the book The Fight for Workers' Power: Revolution and Counter-Revolution in the 20th Century. This is published by Interventions (Melbourne). Donny Gluckstein, Lecturer in History at Edinburgh College, said of the book: "This work combines a remarkable number of features. It is vast in scope but judiciously focusses on key moments of workers’ struggle between 1917 and 1956. Full of fascinating information and detail, it is never a detached academic history but is a guide to activists today, both in terms of theory and practice. By focussing on workers self-activity in combination with Marxist theory the authors steer clear of the traps of Stalinism and reformism, remaining true to the essence of revolutionary socialism. In the midst of all that they still manage to present debates around important political questions. This book should be of interest to readers worldwide, though the three chapters on Australia will give it special value there."

In 2015, Socialist Alternative published Bramble's book Introducing Marxism: A theory of social change which provides an introduction to the basics of Marxist politics for those new to the area.

In 2010 Cambridge University Press published Bramble's book (with Rick Kuhn) Labor's Conflict: Big Business, Workers and the Politics of Class which traced the history of the Australian Labor Party (ALP) from its formation through to the Gillard Government from a Marxist perspective. Australian National University academic Norman Abjorensen described it as "A veritable tour de force. Not since Vere Gordon Childe's How Labour Governs, published nearly 90 years ago, has the ALP been subjected to such a searching analysis".

In 2008 Bramble authored the book also published by Cambridge University Press: Trade Unionism in Australia: A History from Flood to Ebb Tide, a controversial Marxist analysis of the Australian labour movement, attacking the trade union bureaucracy and the ALP. Pilger said of the book: "Bramble has written an important and fluent reminder that nothing is gained without a fight. An essential read."

In 2003 Bramble co-edited the book published by Ashgate Publishing: Rethinking the Labour Movement in the 'New South Africa'  with Franco Barchiesi from the University of Bologna, which analysed the South African labour movement's reaction to the African National Congress post-apartheid. Patrick Bond of the University of the Witwatersrand said of the work: "Bramble and Barchiesi have gathered the toughest contemporary critiques and auto-critiques of the South African labour movement... in a manner that no scholar or activist interested in post-apartheid political economy dare ignore." Ben Fine of the University of London's School of Oriental and African Studies called it "the single most important contribution to an understanding of the trajectory of the South African labour movement."

Bramble also edited the Victoria University Press memoirs of Jock Barnes, the New Zealand trade unionist and has published many articles on the union movements in Australia, New Zealand and South Korea. and global political economy.

Selected books 
 Labor's Conflict: Big Business, Workers and the Politics of Class, (with Rick Kuhn), Cambridge University Press, Melbourne, 2010.
 Trade Unionism in Australia: A History from Flood to Ebb Tide, Cambridge University Press, Melbourne, 2008.
 The Labor Party : a Marxist analysis, (with Mick Armstrong) Socialist Alternative, Melbourne, 2007.
 Rethinking the Labour Movement in the 'New South Africa' (edited with Franco Barchiesi), Ashgate, Aldershot, 2003.
 Never a White Flag : The Memoirs of Jock Barnes, (edited) Victoria University Press, Wellington, 1998.

Selected articles 
 The real welfare bludgers, Red Flag, 6 October 2013.
 Australian imperialism in the "Asian Century", (with Liam Ward) International Viewpoint, 14 November 2012.
 Australian imperialism and the rise of China, Marxist Left Review, Spring 2011.
 Estranged bedfellows: Labor and its left wing part company, (with Rick Kuhn) The Australian, 1 November 2010.
 World capitalism remains in a deep, systemic crisis, Socialist Alternative, 28 September 2010.
 The Music of Industrial Relations and the Reality of the Australian Labor Party, (with Rick Kuhn) MRZine, 2 May 2007.
 Whose Streets? Our Streets! Activist Perspectives on the Australian Anti-Capitalist Movement, (with John Minns) Social Movement Studies, 2004.
 War on the Waterfront, Brisbane Defend Our Unions Committee, October 1998.

External links

References 

Living people
Academic staff of the University of Queensland
Australian trade unionists
Australian Trotskyists
Marxist writers
Labor historians
Year of birth missing (living people)